The South of Scotland Electricity Board (SSEB) generated, transmitted and distributed electricity throughout the south of Scotland, including the former regions of Strathclyde, Lothian, Fife, Central, Borders and Dumfries and Galloway and a few towns in northern England. It operated from 1955 to 1991.

History 
As established by the Electricity Act 1947 there were two British Electricity Authority divisions responsible for the generation of electricity in Scotland based in Glasgow and Edinburgh. There were also two area boards for distribution of electricity responsible to the British Electricity Authority and to the Minister of Fuel and Power. It was thought by the industry and government that a single board for the South of Scotland would be better placed to cover the whole area and would provide administrative advantages such as simplification. The South of Scotland would then be in line with the North of Scotland which was covered by the North of Scotland Hydro-Electric Board for both the generation and distribution of electricity. The new arrangement would provide a more efficient service and better match Scotland's needs.

The Electricity Reorganisation (Scotland) Act 1954 transferred to the Secretary of State for Scotland the responsibility for electricity matters in Scotland and established the South of Scotland Electricity Board, a new public authority for the generation and distribution of electricity in the South of Scotland. Scotland was given control of its own electricity undertakings, and the responsibility for adequate performance became the responsibility of the Secretary of State for Scotland. On 1 April 1955, South West Scotland Electricity Board and South East Scotland Electricity Board were merged into the South of Scotland Electricity Board.

The board operated conventional coal-fired steam stations, hydro-electric stations and nuclear power stations. 

The board was dissolved in 1991 as a consequence of the Electricity Act 1989 which privatised the British electricity industry.

Constitution
The 1954 Act specified the management board was to comprise a chairman and not less than four and not more than eight members. All appointments to the board were to be made by the Secretary of State for Scotland.

The Board's headquarters were at Sauchiehall Street and Inverlair Avenue Glasgow.

Chairmen

South East Scotland Electricity Board 
 1948–1955: Sir Robert Norman Duke, KBE, CB, DSO, MC

South West Scotland Electricity Board 
 1948–1955: Sir John Sydney Pickles, MIEE

South of Scotland Electricity Board 
 1955–1962: Sir John Sydney Pickles, MIEE
 1962–1967: Sir Norman Randall Elliott, CBE
 1967–1973: Charles Lewis Cuthbert Allen, FICE, FIEE
 1974–1977: Sir Francis Leonard Tombs, FREng (later Baron Tombs)
 1977–1982: Donald Roy Berridge, CBE
 1982–1991: Sir Donald John Miller

Electricity generation 
Electricity generated by the Board was from coal-fired steam power stations, hydro-electric stations, and from 1964 from nuclear power stations.

Steam power stations 
Outline details of the Steam power stations of the South of Scotland Electricity Board in 1958 are as follows:

The Board commissioned large coal-fired stations such as the 760 MW Kincardine power station (1958), the 1200 MW Inverkip (1967), the 1200 MW Cockenzie power station (1967), and the 2400 MW Longannet power station (1970).

Hydro-electric power stations 
Outline details of the Hydro-electric power stations of the South of Scotland Electricity Board in 1958 are as follows:

Nuclear power stations 

The South of Scotland Electricity Board commissioned three nuclear power stations.

Transmission 
The supply of electricity was by high voltage cables. In 1958 there were 170 miles of transmission line operating at 275 kV and 841 miles at 132 kV. They connected 20 power stations and 44 transforming stations. There were connections to the North of Scotland grid system and to England via the 275 kV Clyde’s Mill to Carlisle line. By April 1989 there were 526 km of 400 kV lines; 1,565 km of 275 kV lines; 1,642 km of 132 kV lines; and 80,256 km of less than 132 kV lines.

Distribution areas 
Electricity supply to customers was through eight Distribution Areas. The supply and other key data for 1956 were as follows:

Operating data 1949 to 1989 
Key operating data for the South of Scotland Electricity Board is summarised in the table. 

The amount of electricity supplied by the board, in GWh, is shown on the graph.

Dissolution 
As a consequence of the Electricity Act 1989, which privatised the British electricity industry, the nuclear assets of the South of Scotland Electricity Board were transferred to Scottish Nuclear.   

In January 1990 a reactor at the Hunterston A Magnox Power Station was shut down. The second reactor was shut down on 31 March 1990, the day before the nuclear generation assets (Hunterston A, Hunterston B and Torness Power Stations) were vested with Scottish Nuclear.

The remainder of the assets were privatised as Scottish Power in 1991 and the South of Scotland Electricity Board was dissolved.

See also 
Energy policy of the United Kingdom
Energy use and conservation in the United Kingdom
Companies merged into South East Scotland Electricity Board
Companies merged into South West Scotland Electricity Board
North of Scotland Hydro-electric Board

References

Further reading 
 Leslie Hannah, Engineers, Managers and Politicians: The First Fifteen Years of Nationalised Electricity Supply in Britain (London and Basingstoke: Macmillan for The Electricity Council, 1982).

External links 
 THE FRASERS' RETURN (1963) (archive film sponsored by the South of Scotland Electricity Board - from the National Library of Scotland: SCOTTISH SCREEN ARCHIVE)

Utilities of the United Kingdom
Former nationalised industries of the United Kingdom
Defunct electric power companies of the United Kingdom
Defunct companies of Scotland
Energy in Scotland
Electric power in Scotland
Energy companies established in 1955
Energy companies disestablished in 1991
1955 establishments in Scotland
1991 disestablishments in Scotland
British companies established in 1955
British companies disestablished in 1991
Electric power companies of Scotland